Longfellow Peak is located in the Livingston Range, Glacier National Park in the U.S. state of Montana. Longfellow Peak is immediately north of Paul Bunyans Cabin, a rock formation that resembles a log cabin from a distance. Lake Evangeline is northeast of the peak and Ruger Lake is to the east. The mountain was named by R. H. Sargent, topographer for the US Geological Survey in the early mapping of Glacier Park, to honor the American poet Henry Wadsworth Longfellow, (1807–1882).

Climate

Based on the Köppen climate classification, Longfellow Peak is located in a subarctic climate characterized by long, usually very cold winters, and short, cool to mild summers. Temperatures can drop below −10 °F with wind chill factors below −30 °F.

See also
 List of mountains and mountain ranges of Glacier National Park (U.S.)

Gallery

References

Livingston Range
Mountains of Flathead County, Montana
Mountains of Glacier National Park (U.S.)
Mountains of Montana